Angora Peak is a summit in the Sierra Nevada south of Lake Tahoe in El Dorado County, California. The summit marks a point on the eastern boundary of the Desolation Wilderness and is in the Eldorado National Forest.

The peak is located south of Fallen Leaf Lake and northwest of the Angora Lakes.

References 

Mountains of the Desolation Wilderness
El Dorado County, California
Mountains of Northern California